Werner Döring (2 September 1911, Berlin – 6 June 2006, Malente) was a German theoretical physicist. From 1963 until his retirement in 1977, he was an ordinary professor at the University of Hamburg. His main interest was the theory of magnetism. His textbooks on theoretical physics have influenced several generations of students.

He is remembered today for the Becker–Döring theory of nucleation of liquid droplets in solids (in condensed matter physics), and for the Zel'dovich–von Neumann–Döring detonation model (in explosives engineering).

Selected publications
 R. Becker, W. Döring, Kínetische Behandlung der Keimbildung in übersättigten Dämpfen, Annalen der Physik 24, 719 (1935)
 R. Becker, W. Döring, Ferromagnetismus, Berlin, Springer 1939
 W. Döring, Einführung in die Theoretische Physik (Sammlung Göschen; fünf Bände: Mechanik,  Elektrodynamik, Optik, Thermodynamik, Statistische Mechanik), Berlin, 1957
 W. Döring, Einführung in die Quantenmechanik, Vandenhoeck & Ruprecht, Göttingen 1962
 W. Döring, Mikromagnetismus, in: Handbuch der Physik, S. Flügge Ed., Bd. XVIII/2, 1966
 W. Döring, Point Singularities in Micromagnetism, J. Appl. Phys. 39, 1006 (1968)  
 W. Döring, Atomphysik und Quantenmechanik (Band 1: Grundlagen - Berlin: De Gruyter, 2. verbesserte Auflage 1981, ; Band 2: Die allgemeinen Gesetze, ditto, 1976,  ; Band 3: Anwendungen, ditto, 1979)

1911 births
2006 deaths
20th-century German physicists
Academic staff of the University of Hamburg